The Lyons family (originally styled de Lyons, or de Leonne, Lyonne, and also spelled Lyon) is an eminent Anglo-Norman family descended from Ingelram de Lyons, Lord of Lyons, who arrived in England with the Norman Conquest, and from his relation, Nicholas de Lyons, who emigrated from Normandy to England in 1080 and was granted lands at Warkworth, Northamptonshire by William of Normandy. The family originated in the district of the Forest of Lyons, north of the town of Lyons-la-Forêt, in Haute Normandie, where their seat was the Castle of Lyons. The original surname was 'de Lyons' ('of [the Forest and Castle] of Lyons'): subsequently, the 'de' was removed from the name, and some branches removed the 's' from the end of the word, producing 'Lyon'.

During the 14th century, a branch of the family emigrated to Scotland, where they became Clan Lyon, the Lords of Glamis, and the Earls of Strathmore and Kinghorne. During the 15th century, a branch of the family emigrated to Ireland, where they established a seat at King's County that became known as River Lyons, and a seat at County Westmeath that was named Ledestown/Ledistown Hall, from which they served as High Sheriff of Westmeath and as High Sheriff of King's County. This branch of the family owned land in Antigua and later removed from Ireland to England. Their descendants include Edmund Lyons, 1st Baron Lyons; Richard Lyons, 1st Viscount Lyons, the British diplomat who solved the Trent Affair; and Sir Algernon McLennan Lyons, Admiral of the Fleet. During the 16th and 17th centuries, including after the English Civil War, some members of the family emigrated to America to New York, America.

The descendants of the Warkworth family who remained in England had ceased to reside at Warkworth by the 16th century, and resided on estates in Norfolk, Suffolk, and Middlesex. They intermarried with descendants of the branch of the family that had emigrated to Scotland. The Middlesex line of the family produced Sir John Lyon, who was Lord Mayor of London for 1553–1554, and John Lyon (d. 1592), who was the founder of Harrow School, after whom The John Lyon School, and the John Lyon's Charity, and a Harrow School house, Lyon's, are named.

The Lyons family members are the agnatic ancestors of Elizabeth Bowes-Lyon, mother of Queen Elizabeth II of the United Kingdom.

Norman Origin
The family derives its name from the district of the Forest of Lyons, north of the town of Lyons-la-Forêt in Haute Normandie, where their seat was the Castle of Lyons. During the first decades of the 12th century, Henry I of England built a new castle in the district, the Château de Lyons-la-Forêt, where he died in 1135.

The family name was originally 'de Lyons' ('of [the Castle and Forest] of Lyons'). Later the 'de' was removed from the name of the family, producing merely 'Lyons'; some branches subsequently removed the 's' from the end of the word, producing 'Lyon'. The original arms of the family are described as, 'Sable, a chevron between three lions sejant-guardant argent'. The crest is described as 'On a chapeau gules, turned up ermine, a lion's head erased argent'. The motto of the family is 'Noli irritare leones' ('do not provoke the lions').

Warkworth (Northamptonshire) Line
In 1066, Ingelram, Lord of Lyons, arrived in England with the Norman Conquest and was granted lands in Corsham and Culington. Fourteen years later, in 1080, a member of the Norman family, Nicholas de Lyons, emigrated to England with his son, Sir John de Lyons, who is considered the founder of the English Lyons family.

Nicholas was granted, by William I, lands in Warkworth, Northamptonshire, where his family subsequently bought Warkworth Castle, a castellated mansion consisting of a body with two wings, forming three sides of a quadrangle, with a large gatehouse and semi-circular towers, which was the English seat of the Lyons family until 1412. Warkworth Castle was converted into a spectacular house by subsequent owners, during the Jacobean period, but was demolished c.1805.

Many genealogies erroneously state that the seat of the Lyons was Warkworth Castle in Northumberland: this is incorrect, Warkworth Castle in Northumberland belonged to the Percy family. The English seat of the Lyons family was the identically named Warkworth Castle in Northamptonshire.
Several members of the English branch of the family are buried in the Church of St Mary, Warkworth, Northamptonshire: in the North Aisle there is a tomb-chest with an effigy of enclosed Sir John de Lyons (fl.1322), who was Lord of Warkworth in 1322.

The eldest son of Sir John (the son of Nicholas) was also named John (b.1100), who travelled to the Holy Land. There was a branch of the family living in Norfolk, whose members included Sir John Lyon (1289 – 1346), and the father of the infamous English merchant Sir Richard Lyons, Sheriff of London, PC, MP (1310–1381), who was a friend of the poet Geoffrey Chaucer, and who was beheaded during the Peasants' Revolt by its leader Wat Tyler. Some members of the Norfolk branch intermarried with descendants of the branch that had emigrated to Scotland. From the Norfolk branch was descended the Middlesex Branch.

Notable members of the Warkworth family include Sir John de Lyons (1268–1313), Sir John de Lyons (b.1299), who fought at the Battle of Crecy and the Battle of Poitiers, Sir John de Lyons (1289–1348), who was Lord of Warkworth in 1322, Sir John de Lyons (1320–1385), who is interred in the Church of St Mary in Warkworth, Sir John Lyon (1289–1348), Baron of Forteviot Forgandenny and Drumgawan, who was born in Scotland,
William Lyons, Governor of Bordeaux during the reign of Henry V of England (c.1420), and Sir Richard Lyons, Governor of Calais during the reign of Henry VIII. The daughter, Elizabeth, of Sir John Lyons, (d.1385) who was Lord of Warkworth, married Sir John Chetwode: Elizabeth had no male siblings and the estate passed to Chetwode, who adopted the Lyons arms and the title 'Lord of Warkworth'. However, during the 15th century, a member of the Warkworth line of the House of Lyons was ennobled as Baron Lyon of Warkworth, Northamptonshire.

Scottish Branch
Some sources identify the progenitors of the Scottish branch 
of the family, Clan Lyon, who subsequently became the Earls of Strathmore and Kinghorne, to be members of the Anglo-Norman family who emigrated to Scotland the end of the eleventh century in the retinue of Edgar, son of Malcolm III of Scotland, to fight against his uncle, Donald Bane.
Subsequent to the victory of Edgar, these members of the family received lands that were later called Glen Lyon in Perthshire, and, in 1105, Roger de Leonne witnessed a charter from Edgar to Dunfermline Abbey.
Other sources identify the progenitor of the Scottish branch as Sir John Lyon, Baron of Forteviot, Forgandenny, and Drumgawan (1289–1348), the son of a member of the Warkworth line, who was born in Scotland. His son was Sir John Lyon, Thane of Glamis (1340–1382), who married a daughter of Robert II of Scotland, for whom he served as Chamberlain of Scotland: this Sir John Lyon was known as the White Lyon due to his pale complexion. His marriage brought him ownership of Tannadice on the River Esky, and he was also granted the barony of Kinghorne. The present Lords of Kinghorne descend from the White Lyon in the direct line. The son of this Sir John (b.1340) was Sir John Lyon (1377–1445), who married a granddaughter of Robert II, and the grandson was Patrick Lyon, 1st Lord Glamis, who was a Privy Counsellor and Master of the Royal Household.

The eighth Lord Glamis renounced his allegiance to Mary Queen of Scots to serve the Regents Moray and Lennox. He was made Chancellor of Scotland and Keeper of the Great Seal. His son was Captain of the Royal Guard and a Privy Counsellor to James VI: in 1606 he was created Earl of Kinghorne, Viscount Lyon, and Baron Glamis. In 1677, the Third Earl was granted the titles Earl of Strathmore and Kinghorne, Viscount Lyon, Baron Glamis, Tannadice, Sidlaw, and Strathdichtie. His son was a Privy Counsellor.

Irish Branch
The grandson of Sir Richard Lyons, Governor of Calais during the reign of Henry VIII of England, was Captain William Lyons, a Huguenot and supporter of Henry of Navarre who fled to England after the Massacre of St. Bartholomew in 1572. William entered the army of Elizabeth I of England and, in 1599, commanded a company of cavalry, under the Earl of Essex, in the Tudor conquest of Ireland. William was subsequently granted the estate of Clonarrow, subsequently known as River Lyons, in King's County: the transfer of the land to Lyons occurred in 1622, after which a branch of the family settled in Ireland. William also bought the lands of Mullalough, Casement, Killeen, and Killowen, together constituting over 3000 acres, in the same County. The Irish seat of the Lyons family was Ledestown/Ledistown Hall, Mullingar, County Westmeath. Several members of the Irish family served as High Sheriff of Westmeath and High Sheriff of King's County during the 17th and 18th centuries.

Major John Charles Lyons JP DL (1792 - 1874) of Ledestown Hall, was the son of Charles John Lyons and Mary Anne (who was the daughter of Sir Richard Levinge, 4th Baronet) and the grandson of John Lyons, who was High Sheriff of Westmeath in 1778.
John Charles was educated at Pembroke College, Oxford and was High Sheriff of Westmeath in 1816: his son Charles Lyons JP DL also served as High Sheriff of Westmeath.

Antigua and Anglo-Irish Branch

Major Henry Lyons – the son of Charles Lyons JP DL of River Lyons (d. 1694) and grandson of Captain William Lyons of River Lyons (d. 1633) and Margaret, daughter of Sir Thomas Moore of Crogham – married Lady Anne Rochfort who was the sister of the 1st Earl of Belvedere, and emigrated from River Lyons, King's County, Ireland, which the Irish seat of the Lyons family, to the 563 acre Lyons Estate in Antigua that had been founded by Major John Lyons of Westmeath. Henry served as a member of the Council of Antigua in 1710. His son and grandson served as members of the Council of Antigua.

The great-grandson of Henry Lyons was John Lyons of Antigua (b. 1760), who, as the eldest of 11 children, inherited the Lyons Estates in Antigua, which constituted 563 acres. He was sworn in as a member of the Council of Antigua in 1782. John married Catherine Walrond, the daughter of the 5th Marquis de Vallado and of his wife Sarah Lyons (1731-1764): the couple had 15 children, including Edmund Lyons, 1st Baron Lyons, by whose military and diplomatic prowess the family rose to international influence: in addition to his military commands, Lyons served in official international diplomatic posts, including ambassadorial positions in Sweden, and in Switzerland, and in the court of King Otto of Greece. The Lyons River in Australia is named after Edmund Lyons. There is a life size statue of him, by Matthew Noble, in St Paul's Cathedral, which remains in place. After the death of their second child, in 1803, John and his wife, Catherine, settled at St Austin's, a 190-acre estate in the Boldre, New Forest, Hampshire, England.

The influence of the family was increased by Richard Lyons, 1st Viscount Lyons, who was Queen Victoria's favourite diplomat, whom Queen Victoria said that she would permit to represent her 'at any court in the world'. Richard Lyons served as British Ambassador to the United States during the American Civil War, during which he resolved the Trent Affair, and as British Ambassador to France. His influence over subsequent British diplomats was sufficient for him to be credited with the foundation of a "Lyons School" of British international  diplomacy. Richard Lyons knew the Rothschild banking family of France. Edmund Lyons, 1st Baron Lyons was also the father of Augusta Minna Lyons who married Henry Granville Fitzalan-Howard, 14th Duke of Norfolk, and the great-grandfather of Philip Kerr, 11th Marquess of Lothian, founder of the Round Table Journal.

John Lyons's other grandchildren included Sir Algernon McLennan Lyons, Admiral of the Fleet, and Richard Lyons Pearson, Assistant Commissioner of the Metropolitan Police. 

During the late 19th-century, the Lyons family lived at Kilvrough Manor in Glamorgan, where they later married into the Glamorgan Jones family of trans-European steamship agents. During the late 19th century Major Richard Thomas Lyons MD (1875 – 1903) owned Cherry Hinton Hall, Cambridge.

Middlesex Branch

Sir John Lyon (b.1353) owned lands in Middlesex in addition to lands in Suffolk and Norfolk, which he inherited from his ancestors. Sir Henry Lyon (b. 1355) moved to Middlesex. From the Middlesex line of the Lyons family descended Sir John Lyon, Lord Mayor of London for 1554–1555, and John Lyon (d.1592), who was the founder of Harrow School, after whom The John Lyon School, the John Lyon's Charity, and a Harrow School house, Lyon's, are named. The Middlesex line were a prosperous yeoman family who owned substantial estates at Harrow-on-the-Hill. John Lyon (d.1592) resided at Preston Hall in Harrow, Middlesex and, in 1564, had the largest land-rental income in Harrow. There are memorials to this John Lyon (d.1592) and his wife, Joan Lyon, at St Mary's, Harrow on the Hill. The Middlesex line supported the Royalist cause of Charles I of England in the English Civil War: after the Royalist defeat some members of the family emigrated to New England. William Lyon (1620 -1692), was the first Lyon to emigrate to America, in 1635. Richard Lyon (b.1590) died in Connecticut.

American Branch
During the 16th and 17th centuries, especially after the defeat of the Royalist cause in the English Civil War, numerous members of the English family emigrated to New England. William Lyon (1620 -1692), was the first Lyon to emigrate to America, in September 1635. Brigadier General Nathaniel Lyon, the first Union General to be killed in the American Civil War, was a descendant of the family's emigrants to New England. For his efforts, he received the Thanks of Congress. 15,000 people attended his funeral. The 24th Missouri Volunteer Infantry was recruited as "The Lyon Legion" in honor of the General, and carried a unique regimental color, depicting a Lion beneath a constellation of six stars. Counties in Iowa, Kansas, Minnesota, Nevada, and Lyons valley in Jamul, California, are named after him. Two forts were also named in his honor: Fort Lyon in Colorado and Fort Lyon (Virginia). Lyon Park in St. Louis, Lyon Street in San Francisco and Lyon Lane in Carson City, Nevada are also named after him.

Notable members
Ingelram de Lyons, Lord of Lyons, Normandy (founder)
Nicholas de Lyons (founder)
Sir Richard Lyons PC, financier, Sheriff of London, and friend of Geoffrey Chaucer. He was killed by Wat Tyler during the Peasants' Revolt.
Sir John Lyon, Baron of Forteviot, Forgandenny, and Drumgawan.
Clan Lyon
Sir John Lyon, Thane of Glamis
The Lords of Glamis
The Earls of Strathmore and Kinghorne
William Lyons, Governor of Bordeaux during the reign of Henry V
Sir Richard Lyons, Governor of Calais during the reign of Henry VIII.
Sir John Lyon, Lord Mayor of London for 1553–1554.
John Lyon (d.1592), founder of Harrow School, after whom The John Lyon School and John Lyon's Charity are named.
Sir James Frederick Lyon, Governor of Barbados (from 1829 to 1833)
Major John Charles Lyons JP DL, Anglo-Irish politician and landowner 
Sarah Lyons (1731 - 1764), 5th Marquise de Vallado
Captain John Lyons of Antigua, English politician and landowner in Antigua
Admiral John Lyons (1787 – 1872), fought on HMS Victory at the Battle of Trafalgar
Admiral Edmund Lyons, 1st Baron Lyons, British diplomat and military leader during the Crimean War.
Lieutenant-General Humphrey Lyons, British Indian Army 
Richard Lyons, 1st Earl Lyons, 1st Viscount Lyons, favourite diplomat of Queen Victoria who served as British Ambassador to the United States, as which he solved the Trent Affair; and as British Ambassador to France, as which he forecast the First World War; and was the founder of the "Lyons School" of British diplomacy.
Captain Edmund Moubray Lyons, Royal Navy Captain during Crimean War
Sir Algernon Lyons, Admiral of the Fleet and First and Principal Naval Aide-de-Camp to Queen Victoria
Richard Lyons Pearson, Assistant Commissioner of the Metropolitan Police.
Anne Theresa Bickerton Lyons, Baroness von Würtzburg.
Augusta Mary Minna Catherine Lyons, 14th Duchess of Norfolk.
Brigadier General Nathaniel Lyon, First Union General to be killed in the American Civil War.

See also
<ref>[https://archive.org/stream/lyonsofcossinswe00ross/lyonsofcossinswe00ross_djvu.txt The Lyons of Cossins and Wester Ogil: Cadets of Glamis by Andrew Ross, Marchmont Herald]</ref> The Lyons of Cossins and Wester Ogil: Cadets of Glamis'' by Andrew Ross, Marchmont Herald, traces the origins of the Lyon family in Scotland until John Lyon, 3rd Lord Glamis and then the descendants of David Lyon of Baky, his second son.

References

English families
Anglo-Norman families
Noble families of the United Kingdom
Medieval English families
Clan Lyon